Heard It All Before is the debut album by Jamie Cullum, released when he was without a record deal, and produced with only £480. It was released in 1999 with only 500 copies made.

Track listing

Personnel
 Jamie Cullum – piano, vocals
 Raph Mizraki – bass
 Julian Jackson – drums

References

1999 debut albums
Jamie Cullum albums
Self-released albums